Rebuild is a remix album by Scar Tissue, released on May 19, 1998 by 21st Circuitry. It contains four new compositions as well as remixes and live versions of tracks from Separator and TMOTD. The picture on the album's front was designed by musician and sound engineer Nathan Moody, who illustrated covers for the band's previous 21st Circuitry releases.

Reception
Aiding & Abetting commended the music of Rebuld for possessing "a haunting quality, something that is aided by the spectacular use of silence." Sonic Boom praised Scar Tissue for their "talent for grinding percussion and dark electronics" and said of Rebuld that "there is not a bad track on this release" and "if there is a way to reinterpret music that isn't covered by this collection, I certainly don't know what it is." A critic at Last Sigh Magazine called the album "a varied look into their music" and further appreciated the inclusion of remixes and live tracks.

Track listing

Personnel
Adapted from the Rebuld liner notes.

Scar Tissue
 Masayuki Ishikawa (as Tao) – turntables
 Philip Caldwell – programming, guitar, percussion
 Steve Watkins – programming, percussion, production

Additional musicians
 Jason Bazinet – vocals (15)
 Jonathan Sharp – sampler (14)

Production and design
 Nathan Moody – cover art, design

Release history

References

External links 
 Rebuild at Bandcamp
 

1998 remix albums
Scar Tissue (band) albums
21st Circuitry albums